OFS may stand for:

Education
The Office for Students, the government regulator for the higher education sector in England
Overseas Family School, a school in Singapore
Orley Farm School, a North-London prep school

Finance
Oklahoma Office of State Finance
Office of Financial Stability

Computing
Amiga Old File System
Object File System, a Microsoft project in the 1990s

Places
Orange Free State, an independent country in 19th century South Africa
Orange Free State, a province of South Africa from 1910 to 1994
Free State Province, a province of South Africa since 1994, called Orange Free State from 1994 to 1995

Business
Schlumberger Oilfield Services, a division of Schlumberger Limited
OFS (company), an American technology company

Other
Ottawa Fire Service
Operation Freedom's Sentinel, a U.S. led counterterrorism mission in Afghanistan since Jan 1, 2015
Secular Franciscan Order (abbreviated OFS)
OFS Studio, the Old Fire Station, Oxford, England
Oxford Symposium on Food and Cookery, also known as the Oxford Food Symposium